Daniil Medvedev defeated the defending champion Cameron Norrie in the final, 7–5, 6–0 to win the singles tennis title. It was his 14th career ATP Tour title, his first of the season, and his first since the 2021 US Open eleven months earlier.

Seeds
The top four seeds receive a bye into the second round.

Draw

Finals

Top half

Bottom half

Qualifying

Seeds

Qualifiers

Lucky losers

Qualifying draw

First qualifier

Second qualifier

Third qualifier

Fourth qualifier

References

External links
 Main draw
 Qualifying draw

Los Cabos Open - Singles
2022 Singles